This is a list of wars involving Haiti.

List

See also
 Operation Uphold Democracy

References

 
Haiti
Wars